The 1871 Maine gubernatorial election was held on September 11, 1871. Incumbent Republican Governor Sidney Perham defeated the Democratic candidate Charles P. Kimball.

General election

Candidates

Republican 

 Sidney Perham

Democratic 

 Charles P. Kimball

Results

References 

Maine gubernatorial elections
Gubernatorial
Maine